Draženko Prskalo (born 18 April 1964) is a Croatian former professional footballer.

During his club career he played for FK Velež, GNK Dinamo Zagreb, Atletico Marbella and HNK Segesta.

Croatian manager Sergije Krešić, brought him to Spain to play for Segunda División side Atlético Marbella in September 1992.

References

External links
 https://web.archive.org/web/20110712225810/http://www.hrrepka.com:8080/app/hnl/prikazIgraca.iface?id=235
 http://www.bdfutbol.com/j/j7091.html

1964 births
Living people
People from Brod-Posavina County
Association football midfielders
Yugoslav footballers
Croatian footballers
FK Velež Mostar players
GNK Dinamo Zagreb players
CA Marbella footballers
HNK Segesta players
Yugoslav First League players
Segunda División players
Croatian Football League players
Croatian expatriate footballers
Expatriate footballers in Spain
Croatian expatriate sportspeople in Spain